Saint Ffinian was an Irish 5th century saint who worked in Wales. He was a contemporary of Saint David who worked in Wales for thirty years establishing three churches. He is said to have met Saint David in 530AD. His feast day is 23 February.

References

6th-century Welsh people
Welsh Roman Catholic saints
Medieval Welsh saints